The 2020–21 season was Odisha FC's second season as a club since its establishment in 2019.

Colours

Squad

First-team Squad

Transfers

In

Out

Pre-season

Competitions

Indian Super League

League table

Matches

Results by matchday

Personnel

Statistics

Appearances

|-
! colspan=12 style="background:#000000; color:#C47CD2; text-align:center| Goalkeepers

|-
! colspan=12 style="background:#000000; color:#C47CD2; text-align:center| Defenders
|-

|-
! colspan=12 style="background:#000000; color:#C47CD2; text-align:center| Midfielders
|-

  

|-
! colspan=12 style="background:#000000; color:#C47CD2; text-align:center| Forwards
|-

  

|-

Updated: 27 February 2021

Goal scorers

Source: Indian Super League
Updated: 27 February 2021

Assists

Source: Indian Super League
Updated: 27 February 2021

Clean sheets

Source: Indian Super League
Updated: 10 January 2021

Disciplinary record

Source: Indian Super League
Updated: 27 February 2021

See also 
 2020–21 in Indian football
 2020–21 Indian Super League season

Notes

References

Odisha FC seasons